The August 2020 Afghanistan attacks were multiple attacks that occurred in August 2020. The attacks left at least 165 people dead, and another 177 were injured.

Timeline of attacks

See also
 May 2020 Afghanistan attacks
 June 2020 Afghanistan attacks
 July 2020 Afghanistan attacks
 September 2020 Afghanistan attacks
 October 2020 Afghanistan attacks

References

August 2020 attacks
2020s crimes in Kabul
21st century in Farah Province
21st century in Ghazni Province
21st century in Jalalabad
21st century in Kandahar Province
21st century in Nangarhar Province
21st century in Parwan Province
August 2020 attacks
August 2020 crimes in Asia
History of Baghlan Province
History of Balkh Province
History of Urozgan Province
Mass murder in 2020